Henry Frederick Burnett Purdy (18 March 1898 – 7 April 1978) was an Australian rules footballer who played with South Melbourne in the Victorian Football League (VFL).

His father, also named Harry Purdy, was a renowned footballer for South Melbourne in the 1890s.

Notes

External links 

1898 births
1978 deaths
Australian rules footballers from Melbourne
Sydney Swans players
People from South Melbourne